Barron Pywell was the Archdeacon of Central Otago from 1950 until 1966.

Pywell was educated at St Aidan's Theological College, Ballarat. After a curacy at Jeparit,  he held incumbencies at Alvie, Dunstan, Port Chalmers and Caversham.

References

People from Tasmania
Archdeacons of Central Otago
Alumni of St Aidan's Theological College, Ballarat